Michael Peter Purcell (6 September 1945 – 5 January 2016) was an Australian rugby union player who represented his country. He was born in Brisbane.

Purcell, a flanker and lock, was born in Brisbane, Queensland and claimed a total of 3 international rugby caps for Australia. He died at the age of 70 in January 2016.

References

Australian rugby union players
Australia international rugby union players
1945 births
2016 deaths
Rugby union flankers
Rugby union locks
Rugby union players from Brisbane